Rayen is a rural district (dehestan) in Rayen District, Kerman County, Kerman Province, Iran. At the 2006 census, its population was 2,195, in 567 families. The rural district has 45 villages.

References 

Rural Districts of Kerman Province
Kerman County